Rapunzel's Tangled Adventure (known as Tangled: The Series during its first season) is an American animated television series developed by Chris Sonnenburg and Shane Prigmore, and produced by Disney Television Animation. It premiered on Disney Channel as a Disney Channel Original Movie titled Tangled: Before Ever After on March 10, 2017. Its regular episodes premiered on March 24, 2017. The series is based on the 2010 film Tangled and features the returning voices of Mandy Moore and Zachary Levi, alongside Eden Espinosa, Clancy Brown, Julie Bowen, James Monroe Iglehart, Jeff Ross, Paul F. Tompkins, and Jeremy Jordan.

In February 2017, ahead of the series premiere, the series was renewed for a second season, which premiered on June 24, 2018. In May 2018, ahead of the premiere of the series' second season, it was announced that the series had been renewed for a third and final season, which premiered on October 7, 2019, and concluded on March 1, 2020.

Plot
Six months after escaping Mother Gothel and reuniting with her birth parents, King Frederic and Queen Arianna of Corona, Princess Rapunzel is unable to properly adjust due to her father's constant protection. When she and her handmaiden Cassandra sneak out of the castle, they come upon some black rock spikes that magically restore Rapunzel's long blonde hair. Rapunzel, Cassandra, Eugene Fitzherbert, Pascal the chameleon, Maximus the horse, and a young alchemist named Varian uncover the mystery of her hair's return and its connection to the black rocks growing around Corona. Eventually, Rapunzel learns that the Sundrop Flower's power resides in her with the black rocks directing her to the Dark Kingdom.

The second season centers around Rapunzel's group traveling to the Dark Kingdom while accompanied by Lance, Hook Foot, and Shorty and joined by the mysterious sword-wielding Adira of the Dark Kingdom. The group soon learn that the rocks are created by the Sundrop's counterpart, the Moonstone Opal. During the journey, Rapunzel gets the chance to explore the world and learns the origins of the Sundrop and Moonstone as two halves of an ancient power seeking to be rejoined. At the end of the season, Cassandra betrays Rapunzel and absorbs the Moonstone's power for herself.

The third and final season involves Rapunzel returning to Corona to act as queen upon finding out that her parents were overthrown, whilst simultaneously dealing with the threat of Cassandra and Zhan Tiri, an ancient demon that plots on using the Moonstone and Sundrop's power to take over and destroy Corona. At the end of the season, Zhan Tiri steals the moonstone and the sundrop for herself.

Characters

Rapunzel (Mandy Moore) is the long-lost Princess of Corona who adjusts to her new life as a princess while trying to uncover the mystery of the Black Rocks and her destiny.
Eugene (Zachary Levi), formerly Flynn Rider, is a reformed thief. He is Rapunzel's boyfriend who finds his place in Corona as a royal guard instructor and later becomes Captain of the Royal Guard. He is later revealed to be the son of King Edmund and the long-lost Prince of the Dark Kingdom.
Cassandra (Eden Espinosa) is the adopted daughter of the Captain of the Guards. She is Rapunzel's best friend and lady-in-waiting, but over time grows tired of constantly being in Rapunzel's shadow and later learns she is the biological daughter of Mother Gothel herself. She is manipulated by the evil demon Zhan Tiri to turn on Rapunzel by wielding the all-powerful Moonstone before reforming at the end of season 3.
Pascal and Maximus (Dee Bradley Baker)
Pascal is Rapunzel's pet chameleon. His backstory is revealed in Episode 11 "Pascal's Story".
Maximus is a white stallion said to have the nose of a bloodhound. He is originally owned by the Captain of the Guard and later by Eugene.
King Frederic (Clancy Brown) is the King of Corona and Rapunzel's overprotective yet loving father.
Queen Arianna (Julie Bowen) is the Queen of Corona and Princess Rapunzel's birth mother.
The Captain of the Guards (M. C. Gainey) is the head of the Corona royal guard and adoptive father of Cassandra.
Lance Strongbow (James Monroe Iglehart) is Eugene's childhood best friend and former partner-in-crime from his thieving days. He adopts Kiera and Catalina at the end of "Plus Est En Vous".
Hook Foot (Jeff Ross) is the hook-footed younger brother of Hook Hand. He accompanies Rapunzel on her adventure in Season 2 until "The Brothers Hook" to go on a world tour with his brother.
Shorty (Paul F. Tompkins) is a crazy drunk who joins Rapunzel and Eugene on their adventures in Season 2.
Varian (Jeremy Jordan) is a clumsy but smart, young alchemist who uses his skills to help others. Later on in the series he becomes an antagonist but reforms in the Season 3 premiere episode "Rapunzel's Return." At the end of "Plus Est En Vous", he becomes the Royal Engineer and is finally able to give Corona hot water which is something that he wanted to do to in the first episode of season one.
Angry and Red (Vivian Vencer and Ruby Jay) are a pair of young former thieves who appear as minor characters, later as major characters and revealed that their true names are Kiera and Catalina.
Quirin (Jonathan Banks) is leader of the small village of Old Corona and Varian's father.
Adira (Kelly Hu) is a mysterious warrior who serves as Rapunzel's guide to the source of the black rocks.
King Edmund (Bruce Campbell) is King of the Dark Kingdom who keeps the Moonstone Opal from saving the world and is Eugene's long-lost father.
Hector (Kim Coates) is a most dangerous and sadistic member of the Brotherhood. He is the antagonist in the special episode "Rapunzel and the Great Tree".
Lord Demanitus (Timothy Dalton) is an ancient engineer and inventor who lived in ancient Corona when the Sundrop Flower and Moonstone Opal descended from the heavens. 
 Zhan Tiri (Jennifer Veal) is an ancient and powerful demon sorceress from another reality who serves as the series' main antagonist. She personally appears in a child-like form to manipulate Cassandra in season 3 after acting through her minions in the first two seasons. She is vanquished in the season 3 finale.
Tara Fitzgerald as Zhan Tiri's demonic form.

Episodes

Production
On June 3, 2015, Disney Channel announced that the series was in development. On February 15, 2017, it was announced that the series had been renewed for a second season ahead of the series premiere. The series features new songs from Alan Menken and Glenn Slater. Menken previously scored the original film, while he and Slater wrote the film's songs.

On May 31, 2018, it was announced that the second season would premiere on June 24, 2018, and that the series had also been renewed for a third season. Additionally, it was also announced that the series would be re-titled Rapunzel's Tangled Adventure.

Despite the name of the series being changed prior to the release of the second season, all seasons of the series are listed as Tangled: The Series then Rapunzel's Tangled Adventure on Disney+.

Release

Broadcast 
On March 10, 2017, Tangled began airing on the Disney Channel. It was titled Tangled: The Series for its first season. On May 21, Tangled began airing on the Disney Channel in Southeast Asia. Then  on September 12 of the same year, it began airing on the Disney Channel for Latin America. Also in 2017 it aired as part of the Disney Channel Saturday morning block, then named "Get Animated".

Home media
Tangled: Before Ever After and the first four Tangled: Short Cuts were released on DVD on April 11, 2017. Tangled: Queen for a Day was released on DVD on December 12, 2017. The entire series was released on Blu-ray on December 28, 2021 as a Disney Movie Club Exclusive.

Ratings

Awards and nominations

Unproduced comic spin-off
Storyboard artists for the series, Kaitlyn Ritter and Anna Lencioni, pitched an idea for a comic spin-off focusing on Varian titled Varian and the Seven Kingdoms, which saw Varian teaming up with new friends to discover the seven alchemical transformations. According to Ritter, while Disney was enthusiastic with the project and gave support and encouragement, they ultimately passed as they felt that a series that focused on a Rapunzel-related character without Rapunzel would be risky. Disney suggested changing Varian to a completely original character so as to be an original brand, but Ritter and Lencioni refused.

Reception
Reviews of series were relatively positive. Klaudia Amenábar of The Mary Sue argues that the show has "relatable themes" for Millennials and those in Generation Z, with focus on emotional abuse, trauma, friendship,  and creating relationships. Amenábar also argued that Rapunzel's friend, Cassandra "Cass" is "extremely gay-coded sword lesbian", said that Eugene represents "healthy and supportive masculinity", and described the series as a Millennial sitcom which parses out "uniquely adult issues for kids." Emily Ashby of Common Sense Media focused on the appeal of the series to kids and families, argued that there was romantic chemistry between Rapunzel and Eugene, prevalence of frightening moments, and argued that younger kids may not have "the attention span to see it through," while praising the fun character adventures. Furthermore, she stated that series is episodic, better suited "for a slightly older audience" and is good "family fare." Ian Goodwillie of CBR criticized the series for being aimed at kids, while deviating from the fairy tale, having an overbearing king, classic good vs. evil conflict, differing "from the animated movie it's based on", and having a dislikable evil demon. Goodwillie also praised that the actors who voiced Eugene and Rapunzel, said that the series is fun, and has an interesting story.

Notes

References

External links

2010s American animated television series
2020s American animated television series
2017 animated television series debuts
2017 American television series debuts
2020 American television series endings
American children's animated action television series
American children's animated adventure television series
American children's animated fantasy television series
American children's animated musical television series
Disney Channel original programming
Tangled (franchise)
Animated television shows based on films
Television series based on Disney films
Television series based on adaptations
Television series by Disney Television Animation
Television series about princesses
American sequel television series